The Miller Fantasies was a limited-edition EP by Bright, which was initially released as part of 2000's Full Negative (or) Breaks. It was released on its own in 2002.

The covers for the 306 copies of the recording were part of a painting from Mark Dwinnell which was cut into 306 squares.

Track listing
"The New Hour"
"East Coker"
"Commonwealth"
"The Miller Fantasies"
"Orleans"
"Wine King"
"Poison and Earwax"
"The Pearl"

References

2002 EPs
Bright (American band) albums
Ba Da Bing Records albums